The 2015–16 National League A season was the ninth ice hockey season of Switzerland's top hockey league, the National League A. Overall, it was the 78th season of Swiss professional hockey.

SC Bern went on to win the championship by defeating HC Lugano. This title is the team's 14th in its history at the top division of Switzerland's ice hockey championship.

Teams

Regular season

Player statistics

Regular season

Playoffs

Relegation playoffs – Playouts

1st round

2nd round

(3) EHC Biel vs. (4) SCL Tigers

3rd round – League Qualification
In League Qualification series EHC Biel were supposed to play against HC Ajoie, who won the 2015–16 National League B playoffs, but the series were cancelled after HC Ajoie have not handed in their application for a promotion to next year's NLA season.

References

External links
Official League Website 
Official League Website 

1
Swiss
National League (ice hockey) seasons